Çatalköy is a village in the Cizre District of Şırnak Province in Turkey. The village is populated by Kurds of the Kiçan and Meman tribes and had a population of 204 in 2021.

References 

Villages in Cizre District
Kurdish settlements in Şırnak Province